Tokopah Falls, also known as Tokopah Valley Falls, is a  cascading waterfall in Sequoia National Park, California. The falls are formed as the Marble Fork of the Kaweah River slides down a huge granite headwall of the glacial Tokopah Valley. Although the falls flow powerfully during the snow melt of late spring and early summer, it is usually a trickle by autumn, occasionally drying up completely during poor snow years.

The falls are accessible by a fairly flat  roundtrip hike from Highway 198.

See also
List of waterfalls of California
Marble Fork Falls

External links
Tokopah Falls at the World Waterfall Database
Tokopah Falls Trail at Redwood Hikes

Waterfalls of California
Sequoia National Park
Landforms of Tulare County, California